Kupono Low (born December 27, 1978) is an American former soccer player.

Career

College and amateur
Low attended Irvington High School in Fremont, California, and played college soccer at California State University, Fresno from 1999–2002, where he was selected for the Pac-10 Men's Soccer All-Conference First Team in 2002.

In 2000, also played with the Central Coast Roadrunners in the USL Premier Development League.

Professional
Low began his professional career with the California Gold in the third division USL Pro Select League in 2003.  He moved to the Syracuse Salty Dogs of the USL A-League in 2004, before signing with Irish side Sligo Rovers, whom he helped win promotion to the Premier Division. He was also a firm fan favorite at Rovers, and in recognition of his performance with the team he was named to eleven-a-side.com's Eircom FAI First Division Team of the Year for 2005.

In the spring of 2005, Low returned to the United States and joined the Virginia Beach Mariners. He played two seasons with the Mariners, but after the team suspended operations in 2007, Low signed with the Carolina RailHawks of the USL First Division, scoring the first goal in the team's history in their inaugural game. He finished the season as a second team USL-1 All Star and the team's MVP.

While still playing for Carolina, the California Cougars of Major Indoor Soccer League drafted Low in the first round (fourth overall) of the 2007 MISL Supplemental Draft; he subsequently played in four games for the Cougars in 2007–2008, during the USL off-season.

Low has remained a mainstay in Carolina since signing in 2007. Since then Low has earned All NASL Best 11 Team of the Year in 2011 and Defender of the year in 2012.

International
Despite being born in Hawaii, Low was called up to and made his debut for the Puerto Rico national football team in January 2008, in a friendly match against Bermuda. Low scored his first international goal against Trinidad and Tobago in January 2008 in Bayamon, Puerto Rico.

Low earned his three caps before the Federación Puertorriqueña de Fútbol modified its eligibility requirement. All U.S. citizens used to be eligible for Puerto Rico national teams, but now the player pool is restricted to players who have lived on the island for at least two years, meaning that Low is no longer eligible for the Puerto Rico national team per federation rules.

International goals
Scores and results list Puerto Rico's goal tally first.

References

External links
 Carolina RailHawks profile
 California Cougars profile

1978 births
Living people
Puerto Rican footballers
Puerto Rico international footballers
American expatriate soccer players
American soccer players
California Cougars players
California Gold players
North Carolina FC players
Central Coast Roadrunners players
Expatriate association footballers in the Republic of Ireland
Fresno State Bulldogs men's soccer players
League of Ireland players
Major Indoor Soccer League (2001–2008) players
North American Soccer League players
Sligo Rovers F.C. players
Soccer players from Honolulu
Syracuse Salty Dogs players
A-League (1995–2004) players
USL First Division players
USL Second Division players
USL League Two players
Virginia Beach Mariners players
USSF Division 2 Professional League players
Association football midfielders